The Netherlands women's national wheelchair basketball team represents the Netherlands in international women's wheelchair basketball competitions.

The team won the women's tournament at the 2020 Summer Paralympics held in Tokyo, Japan.

References

National women's wheelchair basketball teams
Wheelchair basketball in the Netherlands
Women's basketball teams in the Netherlands